Laura Chiesa (born 5 August 1971) is an Italian fencer. She won a silver medal in the women's team épée event at the 1996 Summer Olympics.

References

External links
 

1971 births
Living people
Italian female fencers
Olympic fencers of Italy
Fencers at the 1996 Summer Olympics
Olympic silver medalists for Italy
Olympic medalists in fencing
Sportspeople from Turin
Medalists at the 1996 Summer Olympics
20th-century Italian women
21st-century Italian women